Oleg Fyodorovich Marusev (2 October 1944 – 14 April 2021) was a Russian film and theater actor, director. Honored Artist of Russia. Actor of Moscow Moon Theatre.   Professor Graduate School of Film and Television  Ostankino.

Biography 
Marusev was born in Tashkent. He spent his childhood in Kherson. In the late 1960s, after the end of Dnepropetrovsk State Theater School, he worked in the theater Gennady Yudenich's  Skomorokh.  But the authorities of the theater was not to the soul, and, after several years of persecution, the theater was disbanded.

Winner of the First Moscow Competition entertainers.

For two years Oleg Marusev was an entertainer in jazz orchestras under control of the legendary Eddie Rosner (in Moscow and Gomel), and continuing education, received diplomas as director at the State Institute of Theatre Arts (GITIS) and theatrologist  The Kiev State Institute of Theatre and Cinema.  Later, Oleg Marusev went on TV, where he worked for 35 years. During this time, he created 12 cycle programs. Leading Russian counterpart Bruce Forsyth's Hot Streak.

On July 16, 2010, he was awarded the Order of Friendship.
In recent years, Oleg Marusev returned to the stage (Moon Theatre and solo performances).

Selected filmography
 1979 —   The Return of the Senses  as Rail
 1997 —   The Countess de Monsoreau  as de Crillon
1998 —  Who If Not Us as head teacher
 2000 —   Turetsky's Marsh as Goldybin
 2004 —   The Thieves and Prostitutes. The Prize — a Flight Into Space as   US presidential candidate Larry
 2004 — Yeralash as Appolinary Semyonovich
 2005 —  The Fall of the Empire as the owner of the attraction  
 2014 —  In One Breath as  Krasavin
 2014 —  The Fourth as   Priest

Awards and nominations 
 Laureate of the First Moscow competition of performers
 Winner of the All-Union competition of young performers
 Honored Artist of Russia (1993)
 Order of Friendship (2010)
 Full member of the Russian Academy of Natural Sciences

References

External links 
 Арт-Изо-Фестиваль
 

1944 births
2021 deaths
Actors from Kherson
Russian male film actors
Soviet male film actors
Russian male stage actors
Russian male television actors
Soviet theatre directors
Honored Artists of the Russian Federation
Russian Academy of Theatre Arts alumni
Russian television presenters
Kyiv National I. K. Karpenko-Kary Theatre, Cinema and Television University alumni
20th-century Russian male actors
21st-century Russian male actors
Honorary Members of the Russian Academy of Natural Sciences
Recipients of the Medal of the Order "For Merit to the Fatherland" II class
Russian drama teachers